Queen's College is a public secondary school in Barbados that was established in 1883. It is a multi-racial school with students drawn from a wide cross-section of the Barbadian community. It comprises eleven departments in which approximately thirty-three subject areas are taught.

Annually a high percentage of Queen's College graduates enter universities in the West Indies, Great Britain, Canada and the United States.

History 
Queen's College was established as a result of the recommendation of an Education Commission whose report suggested that Barbados required a first grade school for girls similar to that in the top educational institutions in Great Britain. The school commenced operations at Constitution Road in Bridgetown on 29 January 1883 with thirty-three female students. Their ages ranged from three to nineteen. The school was managed by a Board of Governors and the first headmistress was an Englishwoman, Helen Veich-Brown.

The school roll steadily increased and in 1946, the place of Queen's College as an institution of academic excellence was firmly established when Elsie Pilgrim became the first female in Barbados to be awarded the prestigious Barbados Government Scholarship.

In 1970, Elsie Payne (née Pilgrim) became its first Barbadian headmistress, and during her tenure of office, co-education was introduced, when thirty-eight first form boys entered the school in 1980. After Dame Elsie Payne's retirement, Colleen Winter-Brathwaite was appointed headmistress of the school in 1985. She was followed by Coreen Kennedy in 1997. The school's first headmaster, Dr. David Browne, was appointed in July 2008.

Queen's College existed as an all-girls school until 1981 when it became a co-educational secondary school. It relocated from Constitution Road to its present site in Husbands, St. James, in 1990.

Notable alumnae 
 Gabriel Abed, Ambassador of Barbados to the United Arab Emirates
 Donna Babb-Agard, QC, Director of Public Prosecutions
 Dr. Jeanease Badenock, Dean - Faculty of Science and Technology, University of the West Indies 
 Dr. V. Rene Best, Chief Medical OfficerChief Medical Officer, Caribbean Premier League (CPL T20)
 Natalie Burke, soca singer
 Esther Byer-Suckoo, Former Government MP
 Jeena Chatrani, Fine Artist   
 Alissandra Cummins, Chair of UNESCO
 Daphne Joseph-Hackett
 Dame Sandra Mason, GCMG, DA, QC, President of Barbados
 Kay McConney, Senator. Minister of Innovation, Science and Smart Technology 
 Michael Mikey Mercer, soca singer
 Dame Billie Miller, Former Deputy Prime Minister
 Lucille Moe, Senator.  Former Minister of Information, Broadcasting and Public Affairs
 Mia Mottley, Prime Minister 
 Dame Elsie Payne
 Monica Skeete (1923-1997), poet
 Dame Patricia Symmonds
 Elizabeth Thompson, MP
 Marion Vernese Williams, Central Bank Governor

References

External links 
 

Schools in Barbados
Saint James, Barbados
Educational institutions established in 1883
1883 establishments in the British Empire